Sivarampuram is a village in Guntur district of the Indian state of Andhra Pradesh. It is located in Kollur mandal.

Villages in Guntur district